Saidingliana Sailo (born 27 November 1997) is an Indian cricketer. He made his List A debut for Mizoram in the 2018–19 Vijay Hazare Trophy on 19 September 2018. He made his first-class debut for Mizoram in the 2018–19 Ranji Trophy on 1 November 2018. He made his Twenty20 debut for Mizoram in the 2018–19 Syed Mushtaq Ali Trophy on 21 February 2019.

References

External links
 

1997 births
Living people
Indian cricketers
Mizoram cricketers
Place of birth missing (living people)
Wicket-keepers